Heretics & Privateers is a country-blues solo album by John Kay, the lead singer of Canadian-American rock group Steppenwolf, released on Cannonball Records in 2001. It has since been reissued on Crosscut Records and most recently on Rainman Records.
This album mixes pure acoustic tunes with others that sound more like Steppenwolf. The lyrics follow mostly a "critical social" style.

Track listing 
All songs are by John Kay, except #3.

"Heretics & Privateers"
"Don't Waste My Time"
"Ain't That a Shame", by Kay, Ritchotte & Wilk
"Dodging Bullets"
"She's Got the Goods"
"For the Women in My Life", dedicated to his mother, daughter, & wife.
"To Be Alive", a cover of a song first published in his first solo album, Forgotten Songs and Unsung Heroes
"I Will Not Be Denied"
"Endless Commercial"
"The Ice Age"
"Sleep with One Eye Open"
"The Back Page"

The 2004 Rainman release includes four additional tracks, which are acoustic versions of "She's Got the Goods", "For the Women in My Life", "I Will Not Be Denied", and "Endless Commercial".

2001 albums